Alfred Callick may refer to:

 Alf Callick (footballer, born 1908), Australian rules footballer for South Melbourne and Fitzroy
 Alf Callick (footballer, born 1925), Australian rules footballer for South Melbourne